The 2007 Ball State Cardinals football team competed in football on behalf of the Ball State University during the 2007 NCAA Division I FBS football season. They won the majority of their games, led by their quarterback Nate Davis who threw 20+ touchdown passes connecting to receivers Dante Love and Darius Hill for more than 10 touchdown passes combined.

Schedule

Season
The Cardinals finished the regular season 7–5, reaching their first bowl game since 1996. The team has tallied victories against Eastern Michigan, Navy, Buffalo, Western Michigan, WKU and Toledo, while being defeated by Miami (Ohio), Nebraska, Central Michigan, Illinois and Indiana. The offense is led by sophomore quarterback Nate Davis (57.6% comp., 1928 yds., 18 TD, 3 INT), junior tight end Darius Hill (35 rec., 517 rec. yds., 6 TD), junior wide receiver Dante Love (44 rec., 643 rec. yds., 7 TD), and freshman running back Frank Edmonds (347 rushing yds., 5 TD).

The most impressive win of the season came at home against Buffalo, where the Cards, anchored by three Nate Davis passing TDs and two Frank Edmonds rushing TDs, won 49–14. The worst defeat of the season, in what was being billed by many as a showcase for who would represent the Western Division in the MAC Championship game, was at the hands of the Central Michigan Chippewas, who routed the Cardinals 58–38. The Chippewas passing/running sensation, sophomore quarterback Dan LeFevour put in his finest aerial performance of the season to date, completing 30 of 38 passes (5 TD/1 INT) while also adding 146 yards rushing yards on 16 carries (1 TD).

Players
 Nate Davis: Passing Yards-3000+ yards and 25 + touchdown passes
 Dante Love: 70+ receptions, 1000+ receiving yards, and 7 touchdowns.
 Darius Hill: 40+ receptions, 650+ receiving yards, and 7 touchdowns.
 Frank Edmonds: 121 rushes, 466 rushing yards, 3.9 yards/per carry, and 6 touchdowns.
 Chris Miller: All American First Team punter.

HB MiQuale Lewis only played 4 games following an ACL injury, but ran for 447 rushing yards, 4.9 yards/per carry, and 2 touchdowns. He also put up 111.8 rushing yards a game.

References

Ball State
Ball State Cardinals football seasons
Ball State Cardinals football